Post Oaks & Sand Roughs is a semi-autobiographical adventure novel by Robert E. Howard.  It was first published in 1989 in France by NéO (Nouvelles Editions Oswald) under the title of "Le Rebelle", since 1990 by Donald M. Grant, Publisher, Inc. in an edition of 850 copies.  The book contains an introduction and appendix by Glenn Lord where Lord identifies the real people who appear as thinly disguised characters in the novel.

References

1989 American novels
Novels by Robert E. Howard
American autobiographical novels
Novels published posthumously
Donald M. Grant, Publisher books